Sphaeromorda caffra is a species of beetle in the genus Sphaeromorda of the family Mordellidae, which is part of the superfamily Tenebrionoidea. It was described in 1870 by Fahraeus.

References

Beetles described in 1870
Mordellidae